Rimicola is a genus of clingfishes found along the coasts of the eastern Pacific Ocean.

Homonymy issue 
Rimicola has also been given as a name for a genus of isodiametrid flatworms by Böhmig in 1908 which should thus be invalid as per Article 57 of the ICZN.

Species
There are currently five recognized species in this genus:
 Rimicola cabrilloi Briggs, 2002 (Channel Islands clingfish)
 Rimicola dimorpha Briggs, 1955 (Southern clingfish)
 Rimicola eigenmanni (C. H. Gilbert, 1890)
 Rimicola muscarum (Meek & Pierson, 1895) (Kelp clingfish)
 Rimicola sila Briggs, 1955 (Guadalupe clingfish)

References

Gobiesocidae
Taxa named by David Starr Jordan